Isaac Sorious (also known as J. Sorioue and I. Soriou, birth and death places and dates unknown, active in the years 1672 - 1676) was a Dutch Republic engraver, etcher and painter, who worked at Utrecht (1672 - 1673), Amsterdam (1672 - 1676) and possibly at Rome (1673 - 1676).

He is known for his series of thirteen etchings, depicting the destruction by French troops in the Utrecht province during the Disaster Year Rampjaar 1672. He is also the author of satirical allegorical prints, for instance on the subject of stadtholder William III of Orange.

Notes

Dutch etchers
Dutch engravers
17th-century Dutch people